A Taste of Honey is the first play by the British dramatist Shelagh Delaney, written when she was 19. It was intended as a novel, but she turned it into a play because she hoped to revitalise British theatre and address social issues that she thought were not being presented. The play was produced by Joan Littlewood's Theatre Workshop and premiered at the Theatre Royal Stratford East, a socialist fringe theatre in London, on 27 May 1958. The production then transferred to Wyndham's Theatre in the West End on 10 February 1959. 

The play was adapted into an award winning film of the same title in 1961 with an entirely different cast except for Murray Melvin as Geoff.

A Taste of Honey is set in Salford in North West England in the 1950s. It tells the story of Jo, a seventeen-year-old working class girl, and her mother, Helen, who is presented as crude and sexually indiscriminate. Helen leaves Jo alone in their new flat after she begins a relationship with Peter, a rich lover who is younger than she. At the same time Jo begins a romantic relationship with Jimmy, a black sailor. He proposes marriage but then goes to sea, leaving Jo pregnant and alone. She finds lodgings with a homosexual acquaintance, Geoffrey, who assumes the role of surrogate father. Helen returns after leaving her lover and the future of Jo's new home is put into question.

A Taste of Honey comments on, and puts into question, class, race, gender and sexual orientation in mid-twentieth-century Britain. It became known as a "kitchen sink" play, part of a genre revolutionising British theatre at the time.

By way of a visual backdrop to A Taste of Honey, Delaney reflected on life in Salford in a documentary, directed by Ken Russell, for BBC television's Monitor that was broadcast on 26 September 1960.

Plot

Act 1

In the first scene, Helen and her teenage daughter Jo are moving into a shabby flat. Within a few minutes, the audience learns that they have little money, living off Helen's immoral earnings—money given to her by her lovers; she is not a true prostitute, being more of a "good time girl." Helen is a regular drinker, and she and Jo have a confrontational and ambiguously interdependent relationship. As they settle, Helen's surprise at some of Jo's drawings both suggests Jo's talent and originality and shows Helen's lack of interest and knowledge about her daughter. Jo rejects the idea of going to an art school, blaming Helen for having interrupted her training all too often by moving her constantly from one school to another. Jo now only wants to leave school and earn her own money so that she can get away from Helen. After this conversation, Peter (Helen's younger boyfriend) comes in. Jo assumes that Helen has moved here to escape from him, but the audience never is told the reason why. Peter had not realised how old Helen was until he sees her daughter. Nonetheless he asks Helen to marry him, first half-jokingly, then more or less in earnest.

In the next scene, Jo is walking home in the company of her black boyfriend. During a light-hearted, semi-serious dialogue, he asks her to marry him, and she agrees, but he is in the navy and will be away on his ship for six months before they can marry. He gives Jo a ring that she hangs around her neck under her clothes to hide it from Helen. Jo tells him that she is really leaving school and that she is going to start a part-time job in a pub.

At the flat, Helen informs Jo that she is going to marry Peter. Peter enters, and a dialogue ensues among the three. Instead of only Jo and Helen attacking each other, a more complex pattern evolves: Jo attacks the others, the others attack Jo, and Helen attacks both Peter and Jo. Jo is truly upset at the thought of Helen marrying Peter, but pesters and provokes him in an effort to antagonise him. After Helen and Peter leave her on her own for Christmas, Jo weeps, and she is consoled by her boyfriend. She invites him to stay over Christmas, but she has a feeling that she never will see him again.

The action moves to the occasion of Helen's wedding, the day after Christmas. Jo has a cold and will not be able to attend at the wedding. Because she is in her pyjamas, Helen catches a glimpse of the ring around her neck and learns the truth. She scolds Jo violently for thinking of marrying so young, one of her occasional bursts of real feeling and concern for her daughter. Asked by Jo about her real father, Helen explains that she had been married to a "Puritan" and that she had to look elsewhere for sexual pleasure. Thus she had her first sexual experience with Jo's father, a "not very bright man," a "bit retarded". She then hurries off to her wedding.

Act 2

Several months later, Jo is living alone in the same shabby flat. She works in a shoe shop by day and in a bar in the evenings to afford the rent. She is pregnant, and her boyfriend has not come back to her. She returns from a funfair to the flat in the company of Geoff, an art student, who has possibly been thrown out from his former lodgings because his landlady suspected he was gay. Jo offends him with insensitive questions about his sexuality, and he in turn maliciously criticises her drawings. She apologises and asks him to stay, sleeping on the couch. Geoff develops genuine concern for Jo's situation, and they develop a friendly, light-hearted relationship.

The audience next sees Jo irritable and depressed by her pregnancy, with Geoff patiently consoling her. Then, seeking reassurance himself, he kisses her and asks her to marry him. Jo says that, although she likes him, she cannot marry him. She makes a sexual pass at him which he fails to recognize, confirming that "it is not marrying love between us". At this point, Helen enters. She has been contacted by Geoff, who wishes to keep this fact secret from Jo.

Jo, however, guesses as much, and she is angry with both Helen and Geoff. Geoff tries to interfere in the quarrel between the two women, but each time, he is attacked by one or the other or both. As Helen is offering Jo money, Peter comes in, very drunk, and takes back the money and Helen's offer of a home to Jo. He leaves, insisting that Helen come with him; after a moment's hesitation, she runs after him.

In the next scene, the baby is due any moment. Jo and Geoff seem happy. He reassures her that Helen was probably mistaken about or exaggerating the mental deficiencies of Jo's father. Geoff has bought a doll for Jo to practise handling the baby, but Jo flings it to the ground because it is the wrong colour: Jo assumes that her baby will be as black as its father. Her momentary outburst against the baby, motherhood and womanhood is short-lived, and she and Geoff are about to have tea when Helen enters with all her luggage. Apparently, she has been thrown out by Peter and now plans to move in with her daughter. To get rid of Geoff, she behaves rudely to him while overwhelming Jo with advice and presents. Jo defends Geoff, but while she is asleep, Geoff decides to leave because Helen is determined and he does not want Jo to be pulled between them. Jo wakes, and Helen pretends that Geoff is out doing the shopping. When her mother learns that the baby will be black, she loses her nerve and rushes out for a drink, even though Jo's labour pains have begun. Alone, Jo comforts herself by humming a tune Geoff used to sing, still not realising that he has in fact gone...

Characters
 Helen: A hardened, working-class, single mother and alcoholic
 Josephine, her teenage daughter, known as Jo, raised solely by Helen
 Peter: Helen's younger, wealthy boyfriend from London
 The Boy: Also known as Jimmy, a black sailor, with whom Jo falls in love and becomes pregnant
 Geoffrey: An art student in his early 20s who becomes Jo's roommate and friend

Productions

Original cast and crew (1958, London)
Helen – Avis Bunnage
Josephine – Frances Cuka
Peter – Nigel Davenport
The Boy – Clifton Jones
Geoffrey – Murray Melvin
The Apex Jazz Trio – Johnny Wallbank (cornet), Barry Wright (guitar), Christopher Capon (double bass)
Setting by John Bury
Costumes by Una Collins

Broadway cast (1960) 
Helen – Angela Lansbury
Josephine – Joan Plowright
Peter – Nigel Davenport
The Boy – Billy Dee Williams
Geoffrey – Andrew Ray

Broadway revival cast (1981)
 Helen – Valerie French
 Josephine – Amanda Plummer
 Peter – John Carroll
 The Boy – Tom Wright
 Geoffrey – Keith Reddin

Watford Palace cast (UK)(2000)
 Helen - Gemma Craven
 Jo - Kaye Wragg
 Peter - Patrick Baladi
 The Boy - Mark Springer
 Geoffrey - Ashley Artus

UK Touring Production 2006
 Helen – Samantha Giles
 Josephine – Samantha Robinson
 Peter – Andonis Anthony
 Jimmy- Chris Jack
 Geoffrey – Bruno Langley

Royal Exchange Theatre Mancheser, 2008
Helen – Sally Lindsay
 Josephine – Jodie McNee
 Peter – Paul Popplewell
 Jimmy – Marcel McCalla
Geoffrey – Adam Gillen

Royal National Theatre 2014 
 Helen – Lesley Sharp
  Jo – Kate O'Flynn
 Jimmy – Eric Kofi Abrefa
 Peter – Dean Lennox Kelly
 Geoffrey – Harry Hepple

Belvoir Theatre, Sydney 2018
 Helen – Genevieve Lemon
 Jo – Taylor Ferguson
 Jimmy – Thuso Lekwape
 Peter – Josh McConville
 Geoffrey – Tom Anson Mesker

Adaptation for  BBC Radio 3 cast (2004)
 Helen – Siobhan Finneran
 Jo – Beth Squires
 Peter – Charles Lawson
 The Boy – Richard Mylan
 Geoffrey – Andrew Sheridan

1970 BBCTV Production
20th. September-4th. October. Three-part, BBCTV mini-series, with Diana Dors, made for schools.

1958 critical reception
Writing of the original production, Milton Shulman in the Evening Standard found the play immature and unconvincing, and others were similarly derogatory about the author's age, with the Daily Mail writing that it tasted not of honey, but "of exercise books and marmalade." However, Kenneth Tynan wrote "Miss Delaney brings real people on to her stage, joking and flaring and scuffling and, eventually, out of the zest for life she gives them, surviving” ; while Lindsay Anderson in Encore called the play "a work of complete, exhilarating originality," giving "a real escape from the middlebrow, middle-class vacuum of the West End."

Popular references
The play was admired by Morrissey of the band The Smiths, who used Delaney's photo on the album cover artwork for Louder Than Bombs. A photograph of Shelagh Delaney appears on the cover for The Smiths' single "Girlfriend in a Coma". "This Night Has Opened My Eyes", an earlier Smiths song, is based on the play and includes a paraphrase of Geoffrey's line to Jo near the end: "The dream has gone but the baby is real." Morrissey's lyrics include other borrowings from Delaney, such as "river the colour of lead" and "I'm not happy and I'm not sad", both of which are spoken by the lead character Jo. Other quotations and near-quotations appear in several other songs by The Smiths and Morrissey.

The play is referred to by Akira the Don in the title track on the album Thieving (2008), in which it appears to awaken him to literature in a school English lesson.

It appears in On Chesil Beach by Ian McEwan as a film watched by the main characters.

See also
 Delaney, Shelagh. A Taste of Honey. Methuen Student Edition with commentary and notes. London: Methuen Publishing, 1982.

References

External links

1958 plays
British plays adapted into films
1950s debut plays
Lancashire in fiction
LGBT-related plays
Methuen Publishing books
Plays about race and ethnicity
Salford
Social realism
Works about teenage pregnancy
West End plays